Dayan Kodua (born 7 September 1980) is a German actress, author and model of Ghanaian descent. In 2001, she became the first and only black woman to win a beauty contest in Germany. She has starred in a number of American and German movies and was honored ambassador for the African continent in Germany in 2005.

Early life and education 
Kodua was ten years old when her family relocated from Ghana to build a better future in Germany. She belongs to the "Ashanti" (warriors) tribe. German became her second mother tongue alongside her Akan language Twi; later she also mastered English and French. As a teenager, she sang and was a background dancer for Chris de Burgh, Sasha, Lou Bega, Haddaway, Right Said Fred and a few others.

At Kiel University of Applied Sciences, Kodua obtained a degree to become a state-certified economics assistant. She later pursued her passion to study acting at the Coaching Company Berlin. And then furthered at the Theater of Arts and Howard Fine Acting Studio in Los Angeles.

Career 
Soon she started modeling and became the first and so far only black Miss Schleswig-Holstein in 2001. Bookings for the fashion designers Thierry Mugler, Escada and Versace followed. She then began studying at the Coaching Company in Berlin. And she trained at Howard Fine, Theater of Arts and Tasha Smith Studio in Los Angeles.

In America, Kodua worked in major productions such as Boston Legal, Passions, and the feature films Crank and Lords of the Underworld.

She has also starred in some German films and TV series including , Balko, Wolffs Revier, and Auf Herz und Nieren. In 2011, she took over Hannes Jaenicke and Anne Will a voice in the video game "AJABU – The legacy of the ancestors".

Personal life 
She is the mother of a three-year-old boy.

Philanthropy 
Kodua has initiated and sponsored some charity projects, including: working for the Michael Jordan Foundation on the Catwalk at the House of Blues, Los Angeles, in 2006 with Angie Stone and Snoop Dogg. She founded Dayan international, which is also making a mark for her homeland Ghana. As the patron of GhanaHelp, she is particularly interested in the Hamburg organization IMIC eV, which campaigns for education for people with a migration background.

Achievements 
Dayan has become a "role model" for Africans in Europe. She was on the cover of the first issue of African Heritage in Europe.

Dayan was honored in 2005 as cultural ambassador for the African continent in Germany.

She is the author for the 2014 book My Black Skin: Black. Successful. German. In My Black Skin, 25 Afro-German personalities proudly show their dark skin. The protagonists from politics and business, art and culture, science and sports report how they made it to the top. They are role models and show that, regardless of skin color and origin, you can achieve anything if you only believe in yourself. She also authored a children's book titled Odo which was published in 2010.

In 2014, she was nominated for the "Emotion Award" and won the Nana Yaa Asantewaa Award in the Media category.

Filmography (selection)

Television 
 2002: Wenn zwei sich trauen
 2003: Wahnsinnsweiber
 2003: 
 2003: Balko – Death of a Driving Instructor
 2008: Aktenzeichen XY… ungelöst
 2008: Dr. Molly & Karl – His Fight
 2009: Der Dicke – Behind Closed Doors
 2010: Unter Verdacht – The Elegant Solution
 2011: Die Pfefferkörner – Enslaved
 2015: Männer! Alles auf Anfang – Men Economy
 2016: Phoenixsee (6 episodes)
 2016: Eltern allein zu Haus – Die Winters
 2017: Tatort – In the End You Go Naked

Cinema 
 2004: The Stoning
 2005: Lords of the Underworlds
 2006: Crank
 2007: 
 2012: Die elegante Lösung
 2016: T.H.U.G: True Hustler Under God

University and Short Films 
 2006: In other Words
 2009: Fremdenzimmer
 2009: Peripheres Verlangen
 2010: Wenn Bäume Puppen tragen

Theatre 
 2007: Diverting Devotion
 2007: Barefoot in the Park
 2013: Mephisto

References

External links 

 
 

1980 births
German stage actresses
German film actresses
Living people
German people of Ghanaian descent
German female models
University of Kiel alumni
German women writers
Ashanti people